The Plattsburgh Thunderbirds, previously known as the Plattsburgh Redbirds, are an independent American professional baseball team based in Plattsburgh, New York. They play in the Empire Professional Baseball League, which is not affiliated with Major League Baseball.

History 
In November 2016, the Plattsburgh Redbirds joined the Empire Professional Baseball League. They play at Chip Cummings Field, on the campus of the State University of New York at Plattsburgh. The Redbirds' name was a play on words with SUNY Plattsburgh's mascot, the Cardinals. In March 2019, the team was renamed the Plattsburgh Thunderbirds. In 2019, the Thunderbirds played home games at Chip Cummings Field and Lefty Wilson Field.

The Redbirds/Thunderbirds have had the following managers:

2017: Joe Winklesas

2018: Selwyn Young

2019:

2021: Sam Quinn-Loeb

2022: Sam Quinn-Loeb

External links
 Official website

References

Professional baseball teams in New York (state)
2016 establishments in New York (state)
Baseball teams established in 2016
Clinton County, New York